The siege of Oran of 1556 occurred when Ottoman troops from Algiers besieged the Spanish garrison in Oran. The siege, by land and sea, was unsuccessful and had to be lifted in August 1556 when the Ottoman fleet of 40 galleys was recalled for duty in the Eastern Mediterranean.

During the time the Ottomans were occupied in the siege, the Moroccans, who were allied with the Spanish, occupied the city of Tlemcen.

Notes

See also
Sieges of Oran and Mers El Kébir

Sieges involving Spain
Sieges involving the Ottoman Empire
Conflicts in 1556
Ottoman–Spanish conflicts
16th century in Algeria
Suleiman the Magnificent
1556 in the Ottoman Empire
Oran
1556 in Africa
Oran
Oran